Shiroles is a village in the Talamanca Mountains, of Bratsi District, Talamanca Canton, Limón Province, Costa Rica. It is served by a small airport (ICAO Code: MRSH), with no commercial flights. The nearest village is Suretka one kilometre to the southeast.  The first school in Shiroles was built in 2009, which allowed students to save the fifteen-kilometre trip to the previous closest school in Bribri. The local people are Bribri and Cabécar and their economy is based upon traditional agricultural practices.

Notes

External links
 
 

Populated places in Limón Province